Wurmbea biglandulosa is a species of plant in the Colchicaceae family that is endemic to Australia.

Subspecies
 Wurmbea biglandulosa subsp. biglandulosa (R.Br.) T.D.Macfarl.
 Wurmbea biglandulosa subsp. flindersica R.J.Bates

Description
The species is a cormous perennial herb that grows to a height of 3.5–30 cm. Its white flowers appear in spring.

Distribution and habitat
The species is found in south-eastern Australia in New South Wales, South Australia, Victoria and Queensland. It grows in forest and disturbed grassland, and on creek banks and rocky ridges.

References

biglandulosa
Monocots of Australia
Flora of New South Wales
Flora of South Australia
Flora of Queensland
Flora of Victoria (Australia)
Plants described in 1810
Taxa named by Robert Brown (botanist, born 1773)
Taxa named by Terry Desmond Macfarlane